Antipterna euanthes is a species of moth in the family Oecophoridae, first described by Edward Meyrick in 1885 as Ocystola euanthes, with the female lectotype being found in the Wirrabara Forest, South Australia. It appears to be a moth endemic to Australia and in addition to South Australia is also found in Victoria,  New South Wales,  and Queensland.

The larvae of this moth feed on leaves of eucalypts, and  fold the leaf tips to make a shelter in which to develop.

Meyrick's description

Further reading

References

External links
Antipterna euanthes: images & occurrence data from GBIF

Oecophorinae
Taxa described in 1885
Taxa named by Edward Meyrick